Kenneth Pogue (July 26, 1934 – December 15, 2015) was a Canadian actor.

Career
His first motion picture role in 1973 was in The Neptune Factor. He almost drowned in scuba gear.

He worked on stage at the Crest Theatre, Stratford Shakespeare Festival, St. Lawrence Centre for the Arts and Guthrie Theater in the 1960s through 1980s before moving to television and film. His other film credits include The Silent Partner (1978), Lost and Found (1979), Virus (1980), Suzanne (1980), The Grey Fox (1982), The Dead Zone (1983, as the vice president), Kane & Abel (1985), Act of Vengeance (1986), Dead of Winter (1987), Crazy Moon (1987), and The Hitman (1991), starring Chuck Norris. He was also Father Dominic in the 2006 film The Mermaid Chair.

One of his memorable roles is Gerrard in CTV's pilot of Due South in 1994. It aired on CBS in the United States. Pogue reprised his character in the Season 2 episode "Bird in the Hand" where Constable Benton Fraser (Paul Gross) is forced to choose duty or vengeance.

Personal life
He was married to the actress Diana Barrington. Pogue died of cancer ten days before Christmas in 2015.

Partial filmography

The Neptune Factor (1973) - Diver Thomas
Dangerous Relations (1973)
Second Wind (1976) - Pete
The Silent Partner (1978) - Detective Willard
Lost and Found (1979) - Julian
Every Person Is Guilty (1979)
Virus (1980) - Dr. Krause
Suzanne (1980) - Andrew McDonald
War Brides (1980) - Strachan
Silence of the North (1981) - The Wildman
Murder by Phone (1982) - Fil Thorner
The Grey Fox (1982) - Jack Budd
The Dead Zone (1983) - Vice President
Gentle Sinners (1983) - Mr. Smith
Louisiana (1984) - doctor
Love and Larceny (1985) - Dan Bigley
The Climb (1986) - Peter Aschenbrenner
Hot Money (1986) - D.A. Dillon
Act of Vengeance (1986) - Capt. McCullough
Dead of Winter (1987) - Officer Mullavy
Crazy Moon (1987) - Alec
Welcome Home (1989) - Senator Camden
Where the Heart Is (1990) - Hamilton
Run (1991) - Matt Halloran
The Hitman (1991) - Detective Chambers
Chaindance (1991) - Warden Slade
Dangerous Intentions (1995) - Andrew
Wings of Courage (1995) - Pierre Deley
Bad Moon (1996) - Sheriff Jenson
Beautiful Joe (2000) - Lou
The 6th Day (2000) - Speaker Day
Crossfire Trail (2001, TV Movie) - Gene Thompson

References

External links
 
 
 Interview with Patricia F. Winter

1934 births
2015 deaths
Canadian male film actors
Canadian male stage actors
Male actors from Toronto